Paddy Murphy may refer to:

 Kanso Yoshida, a Japanese-born British sailor known by the name Paddy Murphy
 Paddy Murphy (hurler), an Irish hurler
 Paddy Murphy (musician), an Irish concertina musician

See also 

 The Night Paddy Murphy Died